The Poropotank River is a  river in the U.S. state of Virginia.  It is a tributary of the York River and forms part of the boundary between King and Queen and Gloucester counties.

See also
List of rivers of Virginia

References

USGS Hydrologic Unit Map - State of Virginia (1974)

Rivers of Virginia
Tributaries of the York River (Virginia)
Bodies of water of King and Queen County, Virginia
Rivers of Gloucester County, Virginia